Papillocithara semiplicata is a species of sea snail, a marine gastropod mollusk in the family Mangeliidae.

Description
The length of the shell attains 8.5 mm, its diameter 3.9 mm.

Distribution
This marine species occurs off KwaZulu-Natal, South Africa

References

 Kilburn R.N. 1992. Turridae (Mollusca: Gastropoda) of southern Africa and Mozambique. Part 6. Subfamily Mangeliinae, section 1. Annals of the Natal Museum, 33: 461–575.  page(s): 517–519

External links
 

Endemic fauna of South Africa
semiplicata
Gastropods described in 1992